Haroon Iqbal "Harry" Khan (born 10 May 1991) is a Pakistan-British professional boxer, and Commonwealth Games Bronze medallist.

Personal life
Khan was born in Bolton, England, to a Pakistani Punjabi family with roots in Rawalpindi, Pakistan.

He is the younger brother of former WBA and IBF World Light Welterweight Champion Amir Khan and is the first cousin of English cricketer Sajid Mahmood, related through a Paternal grandfather, Lal Khan, who came to England after being discharged from the Pakistan Army.

Prior to boxing, Khan played football for his local club before the club was eventually shut down. Khan supports his local football team Bolton Wanderers and he also enjoys Indian Premier League cricket. His all-time favorite boxer is Oscar De La Hoya.

In 2016, Khan married Arifa Janjua in Rawalpindi, Pakistan. Khan and Janjua then flew back to Bolton where their Walima took place.

Amateur career
Khan took up boxing through watching his older brother prevail at the sport as a youngster, as an amateur, he fought in the Bantamweight class where he held 66 wins and 19 losses. Khan has previously won the Junior ABA Championships once and Junior Four Nations Challenge twice.

2010 Commonwealth Games
The highlight of his Amateur career came when he qualified for the 2010 Commonwealth Games in New Delhi following a defeat over Tanzanian boxer Sunday Elias with a blow to the head in the third round.

Khan chose to represent Pakistan after being overlooked by the Team GB selectors in favor of Andrew Selby, who he went on to beat in the quarter finals, and was thus guaranteed a medal before losing out to the eventual gold medalist, Indian boxer Suranjoy Singh. He became one of two Pakistanis to win a bronze-medal for boxing in the 2010 Commonwealth Games, the other being Muhammad Waseem.

2012 Olympics ban
Khan was banned by the International Boxing Association (AIBA) from representing Pakistan in World Amateur Boxing Championships, a qualifier to the 2012 Olympics,  as he prepared for the tournament because he had represented for England as a youth even though he gained Pakistani citizenship in 2010. His father tried to appeal the ban but failed to have it lifted.

Professional career

Super flyweight
Khan debuted at super flyweight, and was coached by Oliver Harrison, his elder brother Amir Khan's former coach.

Professional boxing record

| style="text-align:center;" colspan="8"|7 wins (3 knockouts, 4 decisions), 0 losses (0 knockouts, 0 decisions), 0 draws
|-  style="text-align:center; background:#e3e3e3;"
|  style="border-style:none none solid solid; "|Res.
|  style="border-style:none none solid solid; "|Record
|  style="border-style:none none solid solid; "|Opponent
|  style="border-style:none none solid solid; "|Type
|  style="border-style:none none solid solid; "|Rd.
|  style="border-style:none none solid solid; "|Date
|  style="border-style:none none solid solid; "|Location
|  style="border-style:none none solid solid; "|Notes
|- align=center 
|Win 
|7-0
|align=left| Gyula Dodu 
| 
|||
|align=left|
|align=left|
|- align=center 
|Win 
|6-0
|align=left| Patrik Bartos 
| 
|||
|align=left|
|align=left|
|- align=center
|Win
|5–0
|align=left| Csaba Kovacs
|
|||
|align=left|
|align=left|
|- align=center
|Win
|4–0
|align=left| Francis Croes
|
|||
|align=left|
|align=left|
|- align=center
|Win
|3–0
|align=left| Stefan Slavchev
|
|||
|align=left|
|align=left|
|- align=center
|Win
|2–0
|align=left| Vincente Medellin
|
|||
|align=left|
|align=left|
|- align=center
|Win
|1–0
|align=left| Brett Fidoe
|
|||
|align=left|
|align=left|

Awards
In January 2014, he was awarded the Best at Sport award at the British Muslim Awards.

See also
 Amir Khan
 British Pakistanis

References

Living people
1991 births
English male boxers
Super-flyweight boxers
English people of Pakistani descent
Citizens of Pakistan through descent
Sportspeople from Bolton
Punjabi people
Boxers at the 2010 Commonwealth Games
Commonwealth Games bronze medallists for Pakistan
British sportspeople of Pakistani descent
Commonwealth Games medallists in boxing
Medallists at the 2010 Commonwealth Games